Be Honest is an EP from melodic hardcore band No Trigger. This marks the band's first recording in four years following the release of their last full length, Canyoneer. This EP is also a reunion of the original band line-up.

Track listing
"Commonwealth"
"Tooth"

Personnel
Tom Rheault – vocals 
Tom Ciesluk – bass
Mike Ciprari – drums
Mike Przygoda – guitar
Jon Strader – guitar

References

2010 EPs
No Trigger albums